Number 45 Squadron is a flying squadron of the Royal Air Force. The squadron, which was established on 1 March 1916 as part of the Royal Flying Corps, currently provides flying training using Embraer Phenom T1s and operates under the command of No. 3 Flying Training School at RAF Cranwell, Lincolnshire.

History

First World War
Formed during World War I at Gosport on 1 March 1916 as Number 45 Squadron, the unit was first equipped with Sopwith 1½ Strutters which it was to fly in the Scout role. Deployed to France in October of that year, the Squadron found itself suffering heavy losses due to the quality of its aircraft. This did not change until it transitioned to the Sopwith Camel in July 1917. Transferred to the Austro-Italian front at the end of 1917, 45 Squadron there engaged in ground attack and offensive patrols until September 1918 when it returned to France and joined the Independent Force.

During the course of the war, some thirty flying aces had served in the squadron's ranks. They included future Air Vice-Marshal Matthew Frew, Cedric Howell, Geoffrey Hornblower Cock, future Air Commodore Raymond Brownell, John C. B. Firth, Kenneth Barbour Montgomery, Mansell Richard James, Norman Macmillan, Peter Carpenter, Richard Jeffries Dawes, Norman Cyril Jones, Ernest Masters, Henry Moody, Thomas F. Williams, William Wright, James Dewhirst, James Belgrave, Edward Clarke, Alfred Haines, Thomas M. Harries, Alan Rice-Oxley, Earl Hand, Sir Arthur Harris, 1st Baronet, Charles Gray Catto, John Pinder, and future Group Captain Sidney Cottle.

Inter-war period
The squadron returned to England in February 1919 and disbanded in December 1919. In April 1921 it reformed at Helwan, Egypt. Assigned Vickers Vernon bomber-transports, the unit provided troop transportation and ground support and mail services throughout the Middle East, notably in support of anti-rebel operations in Iraq and Palestine. The unit transitioned to DH9As in 1927,to Fairey IIIs in 1929 and to Fairey Gordons in 1935. At some point the unit adopted the nickname "The Flying Camels". The Squadron Badge is a winged camel, approved by King Edward VIII in October 1936. The badge and nickname derive from the Sopwith used by the unit in World War I and its long service in the Middle East.

Second World War
At the start of World War II, 45 Squadron converted to Bristol Blenheims. From mid-1940 it took part in the North African Campaign and on 11 June, was one of three squadrons that participated in the Allies' first attack on the Regia Aeronautica (Italian air force) base at El Adem: 18 Italian aircraft were destroyed or damaged on the ground, for the loss of three British aircraft. The following day, the squadron participated in an attack on shipping at Tobruk, damaging the Italian cruiser San Giorgio.

During late 1940 the squadron supported Allied ground forces in the East African Campaign, while based at Gura, in Eritrea. During its time at Gura, the squadron suffered losses – on 2 October two Blenheims were shot down by an Italian ace, sergeant-major Luigi "Gino" Baron; among the aircrew killed was 45 Squadron's CO, Sqn. Ldr. John Dallamore.  His successor was acting Sqn Ldr Patrick Troughton-Smith.

In June 1941 to August 1941 the squadron was based at RAF Aqir in Palestine where it was involved in operations against the Vichy French in Lebanon and during an attack on Beirut on 10th July three were shot down in flames by Vichy French D-520 fighters. The crew of one were ordered to bail out but only the pilot, Sgt. Wilton-Jones, survived although badly burned and hospitalized in Tripoli, Lebanon. The mission was a success as a ceasefire was declared at one minute past midnight on 12th July and the allies took over the hospital on 16th July. 

From mid-1942 the unit was deployed to Burma and India, for service against the Japanese. Three aircraft from the Squadron participated in the first Allied bombing raid against Bangkok.

Malayan Emergency

After the Second World War, No. 45 Squadron served in the Malayan Emergency, flying out of RAF Station Tengah on the island of Singapore. There the unit engaged in ground attacks against pro-independence guerrillas belonging to the Malayan National Liberation Army, the armed wing of the Malayan Communist Party. Dubbed Operation Firedog, these operations lasted for 12 years until the successful conclusion of the war. The unit also engaged in operations to quell unrest on the Sarawak coast in British North Borneo during this time period. While operating in Malaya the unit initially flew Bristol Beaufighters. From 1955 the squadron was based at RAF Butterworth in Malaya flying de Havilland Venoms under the command of Squadron Leader Geoffrey Cooper.

1960s to 1980s
Photos of 45 Squadron 1961

After re-equipping with English Electric Canberra B.15s in 1962, the squadron became involved in the Brunei Revolution and the subsequent Confrontation with Indonesia until its resolution in 1966. The squadron disbanded on 13 January 1970 after the UK's withdrawal from East of Suez.

On 1 August 1972, the squadron was reformed at RAF West Raynham, equipped with Hawker Hunter FGA.9s, as a ground-attack training unit. The squadron disbanded in July 1976 at RAF Wittering after this role was taken over by the Tactical Weapons Unit.

In January 1984, the squadron number, as No. 45 (Reserve) Squadron, was assigned to the Tornado Weapons Conversion Unit (TWCU) at RAF Honington. As a 'Shadow Squadron' or war reserve, the squadron's war role was as a fully operational unit composed mainly of instructors, and assigned strike and other duties by SACEUR in support of land forces on the Continent resisting a Soviet assault on Western Europe, by striking at targets assigned by SACEUR, beyond the forward edge of the battlefield, deep within enemy-held areas, first with conventional weapons and later with tactical nuclear weapons if a conflict escalated to that level. The squadron's twenty-six Tornado aircraft were allocated thirty-nine WE.177 nuclear bombs.

On 1 April 1992, the unit was disbanded and TWCU title dropped, with its aircraft and personnel becoming No. 15 (Reserve) Squadron, whilst maintaining the same training role.

1992 onwards 

On 1 July 1992, the No. 45(R) Squadron identity was resurrected and adopted by the Multi-Engined Training Squadron (METS) at No. 6 FTS, RAF Finningley. The new No. 45(R) Squadron moved to RAF Cranwell in October 1995, and in 2003, replaced its BAe Jetstream T.1s with Beechcraft B200 King Airs serviced by Serco. In 2018, the squadron converted to Embraer Phenom T1s.

Commanding officers

1 March 1916 to 31 December 1919
20 to 27 March 1916 Captain C E Ryan
27 March to 24 April 1916 Major L A Strange
24 April 1916 to 24 April 1917 Major W R Read
24 April to 18 August 1917 Major H P Van Ryneveld
18 to 24 August 1917 Captain A T Harris (acting)
24 August 1917 to 16 July 1918 Major A M Vaucour (killed in action on 16 July 1918)
16 to 23 July 1918 Captain R J Dawes
23 to 28 July 1918 Captain N C Jones
28 July to 21 October 1918 Captain J A Crook
21 October 1918 to 3 February 1919 Major A M Miller
3 February to 26 September 1919 Captain J W Pinder
List incomplete

1 April 1921 to 18 February 1970 

List incomplete
1 November to 20 November 1922 Squadron Leader T F Hazell
20 November 1922 to 14 October 1924 Squadron Leader A T Harris
14 October 1924 to 30 November 1925 Squadron Leader R M Hill
List incomplete
15 November 1928 to 4 March 1932 Squadron Leader F J Vincent
1932 to 1935 Squadron Leader H W L Saunders
14 September 1935 to 1937 Squadron Leader A R Churchman
List incomplete
March 1940 to 2 October 1940 Squadron Leader John Walter Dallamore (killed in action)
2 October 1940 – ? Squadron Leader Patrick Phillip Troughton-Smith
 1944 to 1945 Squadron Leader George Oswald Leonard Dyke DFC
List incomplete
24 November 1947 to 1948 Squadron Leader F L Dodd
23 July 1948 to 1950 Squadron Leader E D Crew
List incomplete
27 August 1951 to ? Squadron Leader I S Stockwell
1956 to ? Squadron Leader G S Cooper
1960 to November 1961 Squadron Leader J W Valentine
List incomplete

1 August 1972 to present
List incomplete
February 2005 to April 2007 Squadron Leader JDR Bowland
List incomplete
June 2014 to August 2016 Wing Commander D Catlow
August 2016 to September 2020 Wing Commander R Tomala
September 2020 to Present Wing Commander J Radley

References

Notes

Bibliography

 Ashworth, Chris. Encyclopedia of Modern Royal Air Force Squadrons. Wellingborough, UK: Patrick Stephens Limited, 1989. .
 Halley, James J. The Squadrons of the Royal Air Force. Tonbridge, Kent, UK: Air-Britain (Historians) Ltd., 1980. .
 Halley, James J. The Squadrons of the Royal Air Force & Commonwealth, 1918–1988. Tonbridge, Kent, UK: Air-Britain (Historians) Ltd., 1988. .
 Jefford, C.G. RAF Squadrons, a Comprehensive Record of the Movement and Equipment of all RAF Squadrons and their Antecedents since 1912. Shrewsbury: Airlife Publishing, 1998 (second edition 2001). .
 Jefford, C.G.The Flying Camels: The History of No. 45 Squadron, RAF. High Wycombe, UK: Privately Printed, 1995.
 Lewis, Peter. Squadron Histories: R.F.C., R.N.A.S. and R.A.F. 1912–59. London: Putnam, 1959.
 Moyes, Philip J.R. Bomber Squadrons of the RAF and their Aircraft. London: Macdonald and Jane's (Publishers) Ltd., 1964 (new edition 1976). .

 Rawlings, John D.R. Fighter Squadrons of the RAF and their Aircraft. London: Macdonald and Jane's (Publishers) Ltd., 1969 (new edition 1976, reprinted 1978). .
 Shores, Christopher F., Franks, Norman L. R., Guest, Russell. Above the Trenches: A Complete Record of the Fighter Aces and Units of the British Empire Air Forces 1915–1920. Grub Street, 1990. , .

External links

 
 Air of Authority: No 41–45 Squadron Histories
 45 Squadron, Justin Museum of Military History
 Peter A. Weston, Lancaster Radar/Radio/Navigator, 186 Sqdn, Stradishall, East Anglia (World War Two) / 45 Sqdn (Malaya)/ 209 Sqdn (Korea), RAF, Justin Museum of Military History
 45 Squadron Photograph, Tengah, Singapore, 1950, Justin Museum of Military History
 Peter Weston Bristol Brigand Photograph Collection, Justin Museum, photographs of 45 Squadron Brigands in Action
 Peter Weston Bristol Beaufighter Photograph Collection, Justin Museum, photographs of 45 Squadron Beaufighters in Action

Education in Lincolnshire
45
Military of Hong Kong under British rule
Military units and formations established in 1916
North Kesteven District
045 Squadron
045 Squadron
1916 establishments in the United Kingdom
Military units and formations in Mandatory Palestine in World War II
R
Flying training squadrons